Ruth Almog is an Israeli novelist.

Life
Almog was born 15 May 1936 in Petah Tikva, Mandatory Palestine to parents who immigrated from Hamburg in 1933. She studied at the David Yellin Teachers College, and at Tel Aviv University. She taught philosophy and film at Tel Aviv University. 
She was the deputy editor of the literary section of the mainstream daily Haaretz and writer-in-residence at the Hebrew University of Jerusalem.

She is married to poet Aaron Almog; they have two daughters.

Awards
1985, 2000 Ze`ev Prize  
1989 Brenner Prize 
2000 Yad Vashem Prize 
2000 Andersen Honor Citation 
2001 Agnon Prize from the Jerusalem municipality
2004 Newman Prize from Bar Ilan University
2004 German Gerty Spies Prize for Literature 
2006 Bialik Prize for Lifetime Achievement 
1995, 2007 Prime Minister`s Prize
2010 ACUM lifetime achievement award

Works
Hasdei Ha-Laila Shel Margerita (Marguereta`s Night Grace) (stories), Tarmil, 1969   
Be-Eretz Gzerah (The Exile) (novel), Am Oved, 1971   
Aharei Tu Bi-Shvat (After Tubishvat) (stories), Tarmil, 1979   
Et Ha-Zar Ve-Ha- Oyev (The Stranger and the Foe), (novella), Sifriat Poalim, 1980   
Mavet Ba-Geshem (Death in the Rain) (novel), Keter, 1982   
Death in the rain: a novel, Red Crane Books, 1993,  
Nashim (Women) (stories), Keter, 1986   
De zilveren bal, translators Benno Ehrlich, Annegert Fuchshuber, Ploegsma, 1994,  
La palla d'argento, Translator O. D. Padoa, Mondadori, 2004,  
Shorshei Avir (Roots of Light) (novel), Keter/Hakibbutz Hameuchad, 1987; 2003   
Tikun Omanuti (Invisible Mending) (novella & stories), Keter, 1993   
Meahev Mushlam (A Perfect Lover) (novel), with Esther Ettinger, Keter, 1995
Der perfekte Liebhaber, Translators Ester Etinger, Vera Loos, Goldmann, 1999,  
Meine Reise mit Alex , Translators Vera Loos, Naomi Nir-Bleimling, Sauerländer, 2002,  
Ha-Agam Ha-Pnimi (The Inner Lake), (composition), Hakibbutz Hameuchad, 2000   
Estelina Ahuvati (Estelina My Love) (novel), Ruth Almog & Esther Ettinger, Keter, 2002   
Kol Ha-Osher Ha-Mufraz Ha-ze (All This Overflowing Bliss) (stories), Keter, 2003  
Be-Ahava, Natalia (Love, Natalia) (novel), Keter, 2005   
Meil Katon (A Little Coat) (novella), Kinneret/Zmora-Bitan/Dvir, 2008   
Zara Be-Gan Eden (Stranger in Paradise) (novel), Kinneret/Zmora Bitan/Dvir, 2008

Children's and youth titles
Naphy Nasich Ha-Karnafim (Naphy), Am Oved, 1979 Gilgil, Massada/Modan, 1986   Tzoanim Ba-Pardes (Nomads in the Orchard)(youth), Massada, 1986 Kadur Ha-Kesef (The Silver Ball), Am Oved, 1986 Hasibor (The Wonderbird), Am Oved, 1991   Rakefet, Ahavati Ha-Rishonah (Rakefet, My First Love), Keter, 1992  Gilgil Rotza Kelev (Gilgil Wants a Dog)', Modan, 1998   
Ha-Masa Sheli Im Alex (My Journey with Alex), Hakibbutz Hameuchad, 1999 
Balut Ha-Pele Shel Kamila (The Magic Acorn), Hakibbutz Hameuchad, 1999
Od Chibuk Echad (Just One More Hug), Hakibbutz Hameuchad, 2003

Anthologies

References

4.  Yael S. Feldman, No Room of Their Own:       Gender and Nation in Israeli Women's Fiction (Columbia UP,  1999), chap. 8, "Beyond the Feminist Romance: Ruth Almog", 193-223.

4a. Hebrew trans. of No Room of Their Own by Michal Sapir, 2002, Hakibbutz Hameuchad:  ללא חדר משלהן: מגדר ואומה בספרות נשים ישראליות,  פרק 8: "מעבר לרומנס הפמיניסטי,  200-230.

5. יעל פלדמן, "לתקון את הלא-ראוי עוד לתיקון" , אחרית דבר לאוסף סיפורי רות אלמוג, תיקון אמנותי, כתר 2003 (עמ' 443-473)

1936 births
People from Petah Tikva
Living people
Tel Aviv University alumni
Academic staff of Tel Aviv University
Hebrew-language writers
Israeli women short story writers
Israeli short story writers
Israeli novelists
Israeli women novelists
Israeli children's writers
Israeli women children's writers
20th-century Israeli women writers
20th-century Israeli educators
21st-century Israeli women writers
21st-century Israeli educators
Recipients of Prime Minister's Prize for Hebrew Literary Works